is a Japanese professional footballer who plays as a defensive midfielder for Shimizu S-Pulse in the J.League.

Career
Born in Shizuoka, Miyamoto made his professional debut for Shimizu S-Pulse on 20 May 2015 in the J.League Cup against Nagoya Grampus. He started the match and played the full match as S-Pulse lost 2–1. After the season, Miyamoto signed with J2 League side V-Varen Nagasaki. He made his debut for the club on 7 May 2016 in the league against Fagiano Okayama. He started the match and played the full match again as V-Varen Nagasaki fell 3–0.

Career statistics
Updated to 24 July 2022.

References

External links 

 Profile at FC Gifu
 Profile at V-Varen Nagasaki
 J. League Profile

1996 births
Living people
Association football people from Shizuoka Prefecture
Japanese footballers
J1 League players
J2 League players
J3 League players
Shimizu S-Pulse players
V-Varen Nagasaki players
J.League U-22 Selection players
FC Gifu players
Association football midfielders